Marylise Lebranchu (born 25 April 1947 in Loudéac, Côtes-d'Armor) is a French politician. She served as Minister of the Reform of the State and of Decentralisation under Prime Minister Jean-Marc Ayrault.

Biography
She is a member of the Socialist Party and of the Socialiste, radical, citoyen et divers gauche parliamentary group.
She was the deputy for Finistère's 4th constituency in the National Assembly of France from 1997 to 2012.

She served in the Cabinet of Prime Minister Lionel Jospin from 1997 to 2002. From 2000 to 2002, she served as Minister of Justice.  She then served as a member of the National Assembly of France of the Finistère department. On 16 May 2012, she was named Minister of the Reform of the State and of Decentralization in the first Cabinet of French President Francois Hollande and Prime Minister Jean-Marc Ayrault and Manuel Valls.

References

1947 births
Living people
People from Loudéac
Politicians from Brittany
Unified Socialist Party (France) politicians
Socialist Party (France) politicians
French Ministers of Justice
Government ministers of France
Deputies of the 11th National Assembly of the French Fifth Republic
Deputies of the 12th National Assembly of the French Fifth Republic
Deputies of the 13th National Assembly of the French Fifth Republic
Deputies of the 14th National Assembly of the French Fifth Republic
21st-century French women politicians
Women government ministers of France
Women members of the National Assembly (France)
Female justice ministers
Rennes 2 University alumni
20th-century French women